Panji Ahmad Maulana (born 21 July 1997) is an Indonesian badminton player. He afilliate with Candra Wijaya club. Maulana was part of Indonesia team that won a silver medal at the 2015 World Junior Championships and a gold medal at the 2017 Southeast Asian Games.

Career 
Maulana started his career in badminton in a club Garuda Mas in Tasikmalaya. He has also been listed as a member of the Mutiara Cardinal Bandung club. In 2015, he competed at the World Junior Championships in Lima, Peru, and won a silver medal together with Indonesia National junior team. He won his first international title in the 2016 Malaysia International Challenge.

In 2017, he was selected to participate at the Kuala Lumpur Southeast Asian Games.
 
In 2018, he managed to bring Mutiara Cardinal Bandung club to the final of the National Championship held in Britama Arena, Jakarta. In 2019, he started to playing for Candra Wijaya badminton club. Maulana then won the men's singles title at the 2021 Austrian Open.

Achievements

BWF International Challenge/Series (3 titles, 1 runner-up) 
Men's singles

  BWF International Challenge tournament
  BWF International Series tournament

BWF Junior International (1 title, 1 runner-up) 
Boys' singles

  BWF Junior International Grand Prix tournament
  BWF Junior International Challenge tournament
  BWF Junior International Series tournament
  BWF Junior Future Series tournament

Performance timeline

Indonesian team 
 Junior level

 Senior level

Individual competitions 
 Junior level

 Senior level

References

External links 
 

1997 births
Living people
People from Tasikmalaya
Sportspeople from West Java
Indonesian male badminton players
Competitors at the 2017 Southeast Asian Games
Southeast Asian Games gold medalists for Indonesia
Southeast Asian Games medalists in badminton
21st-century Indonesian people